Carine Adler, Baroness Reid of Cardowan (born 1948) is a  Brazilian screenwriter and film director.

Career 

Adler's break came when the British Film Institute asked her to develop her short film Touch and Go into a full-length feature. The result was Under the Skin, the screenplay for which took her two years to write. According to Richard Armstrong in The Rough Guide to Film, "What distinguishes her small oeuvre is the fusion of her protagonists' desire and their sense of inferiority."

Personal life 

Adler is the second wife of former British government minister Dr John Reid, Baron Reid, whom she married in 2002. She has a son, Hal, from a previous marriage, and two stepsons with Reid.

Filmography

Feature films 
 Under the Skin - 1997, writer/director. Received the Michael Powell Award for Best British feature film at the 1997 Edinburgh International Film Festival

Shorts 
 Contrechamps - 1979, writer/director
 Pianists - 1980, writer/director
 Jamie - 1982, writer/director. A short film made at the National Film and Television School
 Touch and Go - 1993, writer/director
 Edward's Flying Boat (doc) - 1995, writer/director
 Fever - 1995, writer/director

References

External links
 
 
 

1948 births
Living people
Brazilian women film directors
Brazilian people of German descent
Brazilian women screenwriters
Brazilian screenwriters
Spouses of life peers
Reid of Cardowan